Eksperimentet is a 2010 Danish drama film written and directed by Louise Friedberg, and starring Ellen Hillingsø. The film premiered on 28 August 2010 in the Katuaq Culture Centre in Nuuk, the capital of Greenland. The release date of the film in Denmark was 9 September 2010.

Background 
The film deals with the Little Danes experiment, a 1950s social experiment and the problem of cultural genocide in Greenland. In 1951 the Danish colonial authorities removed 22 Greenlandic Inuit children (9 girls and 13 boys), with dubious consent from their parents or guardians, from their homes, relocating them to Denmark for adoption and education. The selected children, aged between 6 and 8, came from disadvantaged families; the government planned for their adoption to integrate into the 'modern' Danish society with the aim of transforming the children into 'small Danes'.

The surviving children lost their native language and culture, and suffered from the psychological trauma of being separated from their families most of their lives. Some of the children were returned to Greenland after a year, where they were placed into an orphanage in Nuuk, rather than being returned to their families.  Others stayed in Denmark for the remainder of their lives. More than half died before reaching adulthood.

In 2009, on behalf of the Government of Greenland, the prime minister Kuupik Kleist demanded an official apology from Denmark for the failed social experiment. Lars Løkke Rasmussen, the prime minister of Denmark, refused, while admitting that the event was "unfortunate". His refusal leaves the issue of apology and compensation contentious between Greenland and Denmark.

In December 2020, the prime minister of Denmark, Mette Frederiksen, gave an apology.

The film's lead actress, Ellen Hillingsø, urged Rasmussen to apologize to the victims. In September 2010, Mimi Jakobsen, the general secretary of Save the Children, the organization involved in the repatriations of 1951, issued a formal apology on behalf of the organization.

Production 
Director Louise Friedberg was inspired by reading I den bedste mening (2006) (With the Best Intentions), a memoir by Tine Bryld. A summary of the interview with Bryld was also released in 2006 as a 28-minute video under the same title. It was shown as part of Rethinking Nordic Colonialism, a Postcolonial Exhibition Project in the summer of 2006.

The old houses of Kangeq were used as a backdrop, as the settlement was to represent Nuuk in 1952. The city center had many communal apartment blocks developed in the 1960s, which changed its character.

The film was produced by Nimbus Film. It was one of six films in 2009 receiving government grants because of their importance for the culture of Greenland.

Cast
The cast has both Danish and Greenlandic members:

Reception

Premiere 
The premiere of the film in Greenland was attended by the prime minister and Maliina Abelsen, the minister for social affairs. It was an emotional event, both because of the topic and because the issue of the official apology still unresolved. Several of the survivors are still alive. Eksperimentet is the first film dealing with the dark episodes from Greenland's history as a former colony. Others are likely to follow, stimulating more discussion and debate in the country, as well as in Denmark. The film was praised for its emotional appeal and acting. Critics thought the release dates in the summer may have limited the size of initial audiences.

See also 
 Minik Wallace

References

External links 

2010 films
2010 drama films
Danish drama films
2010s Danish-language films
Films shot in Greenland
Greenlandic-language films
Films set in Greenland
Nimbus Film films